The Anjaneya Temple at Alamelumangapuram, a part of Mylapore in Chennai, India was constructed at the directions of Jayendra Saraswathi, the Shankaracharya of Kanchi matha.

History 
The idol was installed on 31 March 1985 and consecrated on 26 June 1986.

Architecture 
The temple has the tallest statue of Hanuman in Chennai – about 14 foot high. The idol was made and installed at the request of Jayendra Saraswathi. At present, there are shrines for Hayagriva, Garudar, Ganapathy, a small shrine for two seated and one standing Anjaneya idols, a shrine for Kothandaramar with Sita and Lakshmana.

The temple is known for its koti archana wherein one crore names of Hanuman are being recited over a period of two years.

See also
 Religion in Chennai

References 

 

Hindu temples in Chennai
Hanuman temples